Ken Kao is an American film producer. He is known for his work with Terrence Malick, and for co-founding Arcana with Ryan Gosling.

References

American film producers
Year of birth missing (living people)
Living people
Place of birth missing (living people)
21st-century American people